The 2012 WNBA draft was the league's annual process for determining which teams receive the rights to negotiate with players entering the league. The draft was held on April 16, 2012 at the ESPN studios in Bristol, Connecticut. The first round was shown on ESPN2 (HD), with the second and third rounds shown on NBA TV and ESPNU.

Draft lottery
The lottery selection to determine the order of the top four picks in the 2012 draft occurred on November 10, 2011. The Los Angeles Sparks won the first pick, while the Chicago Sky, Minnesota Lynx and Tulsa Shock were awarded the second, third and fourth picks respectively. The remaining first-round picks and all the second- and third-round picks were assigned to teams in reverse order of their win–loss records in the previous season.

Below were the chances for each team to get specific picks in the 2012 draft lottery, rounded to three decimal places:

Invited players
The WNBA announced on April 11, 2012 that 15 players had been invited to attend the draft. Unless indicated otherwise, all players listed are Americans who played at U.S. colleges.
LaSondra Barrett, LSU
Vicki Baugh, Tennessee
Sasha Goodlett, Georgia Tech
Tiffany Hayes, Connecticut
Glory Johnson, Tennessee
Shenise Johnson, Miami (FL)
Lynetta Kizer, Maryland
Natalie Novosel, Notre Dame
Nneka Ogwumike, Stanford
Devereaux Peters, Notre Dame
Samantha Prahalis, Ohio State
Kayla Standish, Gonzaga
Shekinna Stricklen, Tennessee
Riquna Williams, Miami (FL)
Julie Wojta, Green Bay

Transactions
February 1, 2011: Los Angeles acquired a second-round pick from Tulsa as part of the Andrea Riley transaction.
April 11, 2011: Minnesota acquired a second-round pick from Atlanta as part of the Felicia Chester/Rachel Jarry transaction.
April 11, 2011: Atlanta acquired a second-round pick from Washington as part of the Lindsey Harding trade.
April 11, 2011: Washington acquired a first-round pick from Atlanta as part of the Lindsey Harding trade.
April 11, 2011: Phoenix acquired a third-round pick from Connecticut as part of the Tahnee Robinson transaction.
April 11, 2011: Minnesota acquired a second-round pick from New York as part of the Jessica Breland transaction.
April 11, 2011: Minnesota acquired a first-round pick from Washington as part of the Nicky Anosike trade.
April 29, 2011: Indiana acquired a third-round pick from Seattle as part of the Katie Smith/Erin Phillips three-team trade.
April 29, 2011: Washington acquired a first-round pick from Seattle and a third-round pick from Indiana as part of the Katie Smith/Erin Phillips three-team trade.
April 29, 2011: Seattle acquired a second-round pick from Indiana as part of the Katie Smith/Erin Phillips three-team trade.
May 2, 2011: Tulsa acquired second- and third-round picks from San Antonio as part of the Scholanda Robinson transaction.
May 27, 2011: Minnesota has the right to swap third-round picks with New York as part of the Quanitra Hollingsworth transaction.
June 1, 2011: Los Angeles acquired a second-round pick from Chicago as part of the Lindsay Wisdom-Hylton trade.
January 2, 2012: Seattle acquired the second overall pick from Chicago and Chicago acquired the 23rd overall pick from Seattle as part of the Swin Cash trade.
February 28, 2012: Phoenix traded the 18th pick to Minnesota in exchange for Charde Houston and the 24th pick.
Source

Key

Draft selections

Round 1

Round 2

Round 3

References

External links
2012 WNBA draft board

Women's National Basketball Association Draft
Draft